New York City Transit Strike can refer to either the:

1966 New York City transit strike 
1980 New York City transit strike 
2005 New York City transit strike

Labor relations in New York City